Jane (Jean) Devanny (7 January 1894 – 8 March 1962) was a New Zealand writer and communist. Born in Ferntown near Collingwood in the Nelson district of New Zealand to William and Jane Crook, she migrated to Australia in 1929, eventually moving to Townsville in northern Queensland, where she died at the age of 68.

She is best known for the novels Sugar Heaven and The Butcher Shop, but she also wrote short stories and political papers.

Literary connections 
Devanny was one of the founders of the Writers' League with Katharine Susannah Prichard and Egon Kisch.  In 1935 she became the League's first president.  The Writers' League became the Writer's Association in 1937.

She was a close friend and correspondent of Miles Franklin, Marjorie Barnard and Winifred Hamilton, and was in frequent contact with other Australian writers throughout the mid-20th Century.

In 1948, she approached Mary Gilmore to write a foreword to Travels in North Queensland, but Gilmore declined on the basis that Devanny should write it herself, as 'I have written so many that I have decided not to write any more for a time, as they will have no value by now'.

Political activity 

Devanny joined the Communist Party of Australia in the early 1920s, and had a long-term affair with the general secretary Jack Miles; called "Leader" in her memoirs. However, many in the party disagreed with her "forthright avant-garde views" and her candid discussion of sexual activities and women's sexuality. The style of writing of Sugar Heaven was called "reportage" or "fact in the form of fiction" by Egon Kisch. However, the party bureaucracy's treatment of her novel Cindie (about the North Queensland sugar industry) finally provoked her resignation in 1950.    

She had had several disagreements with the leadership of the party that led to her expulsion in 1940. She rejoined the party in 1944, but left permanently in 1950. Despite the egalitarian ideals espoused by the ideology of Communism, the party leadership was dominated by men, who often stayed true to the idea that women's participation in politics was best left to a supporting role. Although she remained a staunch Communist for years after leaving the party, she often expressed disagreement and dissatisfaction with many other communists of the time – most notably Picasso, of whom she reportedly said: 'Picasso hasn't got any political opinions. His work proves that. He's only got a sentimental attachment to the idea of social justice'.

Devanny was known to use her novels as a way of expressing ideological concepts and principles. During the 1930s, she toured North Queensland to spread propaganda for the Communist movement. Sugar Heaven was written during this period, drawing upon her experiences working as a domestic servant on a sugar  and was intended to be a form of propaganda. Despite decreasing her political activity in her later years, she did continue to express her opinions on local, national and global political events and figures.

Later years 
Devanny later regretted viewing her novels as a way to convey ideology, rather than trying to write to the best of her abilities.  She later noted: 'I realise now that I have not exploited the small measure of ability for writing I possess one whit. I never really got down to it and THOUGHT. Thought was reserved for politics'. Devanny moved to North Queensland during the 1940s and spent the last two decades of her life in the region, expanding her knowledge of the natural world, taking part in multiple anthropological trips along the cost of North Queensland. During the 1950s, she wrote many articles and stories, which documented many details about the region during the mid Twentieth Century, focusing on a range of themes, such as the relations between White Australians and Indigenous. She died on 8 March 1962 in Townsville, having been diagnosed with chronic leukaemia.  Her remains were cremated in Rockhampton.

Her daughter Pat also became a communist activist.

Records and collections 
The Eddie Koiki Mabo Library at James Cook University, Townsville, holds copies of all of Devanny's published works in the North Queensland Collection. Many of Devanny's private papers, consisting of drafts of speeches, published and unpublished articles, personal communications and letters, are held in the Library's Special Collections.

Bibliography

Novels 

 The Butcher Shop (1926)
 Lenore Divine (1926)
 Dawn Beloved (1928)
 Riven (1929)
 Devil Made saint (1930)
 Bushman Burke (1930) (aka Taipo)
 Poor Swine (1932)
 Out of Such Fires (1934)
 The Virtuous Courtesan (1935)
 The Ghost Wife (1935)
 Sugar Heaven (1936)
 Paradise Flow (1938)
 The Killing of Jacqueline Love (1942)
 Roll Back the Night (1945)
 Cindie : A Chronicle of the Canefields (1949)

Short story collection 

 Old Savage : And Other Stories (1927)

Non-fiction 
 By Tropic Sea and Jungle : Adventures in North Queensland (1944) - travel
 Bird of Paradise (1945) - biography
 Travels in North Queensland (1951) - travel
 Point of Departure: The Autobiography of Jean Devanny (1987) - autobiography

External links 
Jean Devanny by Carole Ferrier (2007 essay)
Jean Devanny at the "Dictionary of New Zealand Biography" 
Jean Devanny at the "Australian Dictionary of Biography" 
A 1926 review of The Butcher Shop 
Joan Stevens on The Butcher Shop (1962)

References

1894 births
1962 deaths
Australian women novelists
New Zealand communists
New Zealand women novelists
New Zealand emigrants to Australia
20th-century New Zealand novelists
20th-century Australian novelists
Communist women writers
People from Collingwood, New Zealand
20th-century New Zealand women writers
20th-century Australian women writers
People from Townsville
Communist Party of Australia members